Sphaerius acaroides is a species of beetle belonging to the family Sphaeriusidae.

It is native to Europe.

References

Myxophaga